Golden Child may refer to:
 The Golden Child, a 1986 film starring Eddie Murphy
 The Golden Child (novel), a 1977 novel by Penelope Fitzgerald
 Golden Child (play), a 1998 play by David Henry Hwang
 Golden Child, a 2018 album by Judith Hill
 "Golden Child", a 1997 song by DJ Sammy from the album Life Is Just a Game
 "Golden Child", a 2018 song by Say Lou Lou from the album Immortelle
 "Golden Child", a 2022 song by Lil Durk from the album 7220
 Golden Child (comics), a Marvel Comics mutant
 Golden Child (band), a South Korean boy band
 Golden Child (novel), novel by Claire Adam listed by the BBC as one of the 100 'most influential' novels